Heinolan maalaiskunta (literally "Heinola Rural Municipality") is a former municipality in Päijänne Tavastia, Finland. It was established in 1848. It surrounded Heinola town and was united to Heinola in 1997. Most of its surface area was forest. Population was about 8000 before uniting to Heinola.

Coat of arms was figuring sleigh parts. Theme was inspired in 1934, describing maybe the world's oldest part that included to sleigh. Part was founded from Tuusjärvi village and is now held in National Museum of Finland, Helsinki.

See also
Itä-Häme
Vierumäki

References

Heinola
Former municipalities of Finland